Cham Tang or Cham-e Tang may refer to:
 Cham Tang, Bushehr
 Cham Tang, Khuzestan

See also
 Cham Tangu